The HCU-6/E or 463L Master Pallet is a standardized pallet used for transporting military air cargo. It is the main air-cargo pallet of the United States Air Force, designed to be loaded and offloaded on today's military airlifters as well as many civilian Civil Reserve Air Fleet (CRAF) cargo aircraft.

Description

The "SS-463L" project was developed by a U.S. Air Force committee in 1957 and awarded to the Douglas Aircraft Company in 1959. The "SS-463L Pallet Cargo Handling System" specifications for aircraft (aka "463L") included a "Master Pallet" design to meet a component of the material handling specifications of this system. The "Master Pallet" was contracted to the AAR Cadillac Manufacturing Corporation, at one time AAR Cadillac Corp, and now AAR Corp.
 
In the 1950s, the U.S. Air Force used a standard designation system for all awarded projects. The "SS" represents Support System, the "463" represents an assigned general system category, 400–499 series for "Support Systems", and the suffix "L" also represents "Support Systems". The "463L" does not stand for the period that the pallet was initiated (April 1963); it is the name of the system.
 
The standard HCU-6/E pallet in the "463L" system was designed and finalized in the early 1960s by the AAR Cadillac Corp. to implement the "SS-463L Pallet Cargo Handling System" now known as "Materials Handling Support System "463L"". The original design of the HCU-6/E pallet met the standards of the Universal Cargo Handling Rail System design in 1962 for the C-130 and C-141 transport aircraft. The new sturdy HCU-6/E pallet was a drastic improvement to the older lightweight balsa wood pallets used by the Air Force in previous years.
It can hold up to 10,000 lb (4,500 kg) of cargo (not exceeding 250 lb per square inch) at 8 g.

Based on the HCU-6/E air cargo Master Pallet, additional components include the HCU-7/E side net, the HCU-15/C top net, and the CGU-1/B Device or cargo strap. MB-1 Devices or MB-2 Devices may be used with appropriate chains.

The "463L Master Pallets" can be unloaded on the ground in peacetime or in combat.

They are built of a balsa wood core and surrounded by a thin aluminum skin.

Aircraft capabilities

* Including one on the ramp

** 11 in centerline configuration

See also
 Unit Load Device (ULD), lightweight aluminium and plastic pallet or container, designed for commercial aircraft.
 Department of Defense container system
 Oversize cargo

References

Projects on designation-systems.net

Journal article by Kenneth P. Werrell; Air Power History, Vol. 50, 2003
L3ABR2T231-004-II Air Transportation Apprentice Course Study Guide, May 2000, US Air Force, 345TRS, Lackland AFB, Texas
463L-pallet Global Security article
Online information for Defence Community
United States Patent Application
USAF T.O. 1C-46(K)A-5
USAF T.O. 1C-135-9

Pallets
Equipment of the United States Air Force
Military equipment introduced in the 1960s